Whitney Cummings (born September 4, 1982) is an American stand-up comedian, actress, writer, director, producer, and podcaster.

Early life 
Cummings was born on September 4, 1982, in Washington, D.C., to Patti Cummings, a native of Texas and a public relations director of Neiman Marcus at Mazza Gallerie; and Eric Lynn Cummings, a lawyer and venture capitalist from West Virginia. She has an older half-brother named Kevin and an older sister named Ashley. Cummings was raised Roman Catholic. Her parents divorced when she was five years old.

She has stated that she was raised in a dysfunctional, alcoholic household. At age 12, she temporarily resided with her aunt in Virginia, and spent summers in Harpers Ferry, West Virginia, where her father worked as a manager at the Hill Top House Hotel. Cummings attended St. Andrew's Episcopal School in Potomac, Maryland, graduating in 2000. During high school, she interned at Washington's NBC-owned television station WRC-TV. She studied acting at Washington, D.C.'s Studio Theater.

After high school, Cummings enrolled at the Annenberg School for Communication at the University of Pennsylvania. During this time, she worked as a department store model at local shopping malls. She graduated magna cum laude in 2004 with a degree in Communications, and initially aspired to a career as a journalist.

Career

2004–2010: Beginnings 
Cummings moved to Los Angeles after college and worked on Punk'd on MTV in 2004. That same year, she starred in the low-budget thriller EMR, which was screened at Cannes. Cummings began performing stand-up in 2004. In 2007, Variety named her one of 10 Comics to Watch in 2007. In 2008, she appeared in the San Francisco audition for Last Comic Standing, although she did not pass the showcase.

She co-starred on The Tony Rock Project and appeared in the 2008 romantic comedy Made of Honor. Beginning in 2007, Cummings appeared as a regular roundtable guest on the E! series Chelsea Lately, and continued to appear until its conclusion in 2014. In 2008, she was named one of 12 Rising Stars of Comedy by Entertainment Weekly. She subsequently appeared as a comedy roaster in the Comedy Central Roasts of Joan Rivers (2009), David Hasselhoff (2010), and Donald Trump (2011).

In August 2010, her first one-hour special, titled Whitney Cummings: Money Shot, premiered on Comedy Central. In 2010, Cummings went on tour with Denis Leary and the Rescue Me Comedy Tour to promote the show's sixth season. She dated Cameron Fegreus. She also appeared with Leary on Douchebags and Donuts.

2011–present: Television projects and specials, book 

In 2011, two multi-camera, live-audience sitcoms that Cummings created were picked up by broadcast networks: 2 Broke Girls (which she co-created and executive produced with Michael Patrick King) and Whitney (which she starred in, executive produced, and created). Whitney, in which Cummings portrayed a semi-fictionalized version of herself, was not well received by critics, and Cummings acknowledges it was a learning curve for her. The series was canceled after two seasons in May 2013. While still working on the second season of Whitney, Cummings also hosted a talk show, Love You, Mean It with Whitney Cummings, on E! in 2012, which was cancelled after 11 episodes.

Cummings later stated that she was overworking herself during this period, and was also in the midst of battling an eating disorder in which she would binge eat followed by compulsive exercise. In June 2014, Cummings released her second hour-long special, I Love You, on Comedy Central.

Her third hour-long special debuted on HBO in 2016, titled "I'm Your Girlfriend". Reviews were mixed, suggesting it felt less comedic than her previous stand up performances.

Cummings had a supporting role in the 2017 thriller Unforgettable, starring Katherine Heigl and Rosario Dawson, released in April 2017. The following month, 2 Broke Girls was cancelled after having run six consecutive seasons. Cummings made her directorial debut with The Female Brain (2017), an independent comedy film distributed by IFC Films, which Cummings also starred in.

Also in 2017, Cummings published her first book, titled I'm Fine...And Other Lies, a collection of personal stories about her life.

Beginning in 2018, Cummings served as one of the head writers, an executive producer, and overseer of day-to-day production of the revival of the comedy series Roseanne, for ABC. Cummings left the show, however, after its star, Roseanne Barr, made a series of inflammatory, racially charged jokes on her Twitter account, which subsequently resulted in the series' cancellation.

Her fourth hour-long special, Can I Touch It?, was released on July 30, 2019, on Netflix. This special features a robot that Cummings had custom made to look exactly like her, and she brings this robot out at the end of the special.

On November 5, 2019, Cummings launched her first podcast entitled Good for You. Her first guest was actor/producer Dan Levy. Good for You is co-hosted by former assistant and fellow comedian Benton Ray, and features a wide variety of guests, ranging from politicians and comedians to actors and journalists. Fans of the show appreciate Cumming's regular guests, including Nikki Glaser who has featured in multiple episodes, creating the impression of a "highly relatable friendship."

Cummings has a chapter giving advice in Tim Ferriss' book Tools of Titans.

Influences 

Cummings has described her comedic influences, beginning with Paul Reiser, whom she said, "made these hysterical, brilliant commentary about the most mundane things and open it up to a hysterical world". Other important influences for her were George Carlin, who she says challenged her to "question everything". Later influences were Dave Attell ("a legend now but he's very edgy"), Lenny Bruce, and Bill Hicks.

Filmography

Film

Television

Comedy specials

Bibliography

References

External links 

 
 
 
 

1982 births
21st-century American actresses
Actresses from Maryland
Actresses from Washington, D.C.
Female models from Washington, D.C.
American film actresses
American podcasters
American stand-up comedians
American television actresses
American television producers
American television writers
American women comedians
American women podcasters
American women television producers
American women television writers
Catholics from Washington, D.C.
Living people
People from Potomac, Maryland
Showrunners
Annenberg School for Communication at the University of Pennsylvania alumni
Female models from Maryland
21st-century American comedians
Screenwriters from Maryland
Screenwriters from Washington, D.C.
People from Georgetown (Washington, D.C.)
21st-century American screenwriters
Articles containing video clips